Diana Hamilton may refer to:

 Diana Hamilton (writer) (died 2009), British writer of romance novels
 Diana Hamilton (actress), British stage actress and playwright
 Diana Hamilton (musician), Ghanaian gospel musician